The 2014 United States Senate election in Alaska took place on November 4, 2014, to elect a member of the United States Senate to represent the State of Alaska, concurrently with the election of the governor of Alaska, as well as other elections to the United States Senate in other states and elections to the United States House of Representatives and various state and local elections.

Incumbent Democratic U.S. Senator Mark Begich ran for re-election to a second term in office. Primary elections were held on August 19, 2014. Begich was renominated and the Republicans picked former Commissioner of the Alaska Department of Natural Resources Dan Sullivan.

On November 7, Sullivan held an 8,000-vote lead, which on November 11 had shrunk slightly to 7,991 votes. Multiple media outlets called the race for Sullivan on November 12 and Begich conceded to Sullivan on November 17. Republican Sean Parnell simultaneously lost the gubernatorial election to independent candidate Bill Walker, marking just the fifth time in the last 50 years in which U.S. Senate and gubernatorial incumbents from different political parties were simultaneously defeated in the same state.

Background
Democrat Mark Begich won the 2008 election, defeating seven-term Republican incumbent Ted Stevens by just under 4,000 votes. A few days before the election, Stevens had been convicted of a felony, but the case against Stevens was later dismissed by the Justice Department after the election, when serious issues of prosecutorial misconduct emerged. In the 2012 presidential election, Mitt Romney easily won Alaska by 13 points, which made Begich a prime target during an election cycle in which Republicans needed a net gain of six seats to retake control of the Senate.

Democratic–Libertarian–Independence primary
Candidates from the Alaska Democratic Party, Alaska Libertarian Party and Alaskan Independence Party appear on the same ballot, with the highest-placed candidate from each party receiving that party's nomination.

Democratic candidates

Declared
 Mark Begich, incumbent U.S. Senator
 William Bryk, attorney and perennial candidate from New York

Alaskan Independence candidates

Declared
 Zachary Kile, orthopedic surgeon
 Vic Kohring, former Republican State Representative

Libertarian candidates

Declared
 Mark Fish, former chairman of the Alaska Libertarian Party, former Sarah Palin and Joe Miller staffer and Republican nominee for the state house in 2008
 Scott Kohlhaas, former chairman of the Alaska Libertarian Party and perennial candidate
 Thom Walker, University of Alaska Brooks Range research station operations manager

Declined
 Joe Miller, former magistrate judge, Republican nominee for the U.S. Senate in 2010 and candidate for the U.S. Senate in 2014

Results

Subsequent events
In an upset, the unknown Thom Walker won the Libertarian nomination despite not campaigning and raising no money. Libertarians speculated that he was a Republican "plant" designed to keep a more viable Libertarian from winning the nomination and then taking votes away from the Republican nominee in the general election. They further speculated that Walker was chosen because he shared a surname with Bill Walker (no relation), who was running as an independent candidate in the 2014 gubernatorial election, and that voters may have been confused because Bill Walker did not appear on the primary ballot and thus they may have voted for Thom Walker in error. This confusion could have extended to the general election, with voters picking Thom Walker for the Senate, thinking he was Bill Walker.

Walker withdrew from the race on August 27, saying that "my work location and schedule will have me out of town, out of contact and off the campaign trail for too long." The Libertarian executive board replaced him as the nominee with Mark Fish.

Alaskan Independence nominee Vic Kohring, who had changed his voter registration from Republican to Alaskan Independence just before the filing deadline, withdrew from the race on September 2 and endorsed Dan Sullivan. The Alaskan Independence Party did not name a replacement nominee before the deadline for them to do so had passed.

Republican primary

Candidates

Declared

 John Jaramillo, air force veteran
 Joe Miller, former U.S. magistrate judge and nominee for the U.S. Senate in 2010
 Dan Sullivan, former Commissioner of the Alaska Department of Natural Resources and former Alaska Attorney General
 Mead Treadwell, Lieutenant Governor of Alaska

Withdrew
 Kathleen Tonn, anti-abortion activist

Declined
 Timothy Mark Burgess, judge on the United States District Court for the District of Alaska
 Loren Leman, former lieutenant governor
 Lesil McGuire, state senator
 Sarah Palin, former Governor of Alaska and nominee for Vice President of the United States in 2008 
 Sean Parnell, Governor of Alaska (ran for re-election and lost)
 Dan Sullivan, Mayor of Anchorage (ran for Lieutenant Governor and lost)

Former
 Ted Stevens, former U.S. Senator. Stevens had filed to run, and would have been 90 years old on Election Day, but he was killed in a plane crash on August 9, 2010.

Endorsements

Polling

Results

Independents

Candidates

Declared
 Ted Gianoutsos, founder of the Veterans Party of Alaska and perennial candidate
 Sid Hill, political gadfly
 Stubbs, cat and mayor of Talkeetna, Alaska

Declined
 Joe Miller, former magistrate judge and Republican nominee for the U.S. Senate in 2010

General election

Fundraising

Debates
Begich and Sullivan participated in a televised debate regarding fisheries on August 27, 2014, at the University of Alaska Anchorage. Another televised debate concerning natural resources was held on October 1 in Kodiak, Alaska.

 Complete video of debate

Predictions

Polling

with Leman

with Miller

with Palin

with Parnell

with Dan A. Sullivan

with Treadwell

Results

See also
 2014 Alaska gubernatorial election
 2014 United States Senate elections
 2014 United States elections
 Stubbs (cat), notable write-in candidate and honorary Mayor of Talkeetna, Alaska

References

External links

U.S. Senate elections in Alaska, 2014 at Ballotpedia
Alaska Senate debate excerpts, OnTheIssues.org
Campaign contributions at OpenSecrets
Campaign websites
Mark Begich for U.S. Senate
Dan Sullivan for U.S. Senate
Vic Kohring for U.S. Senate

2014
Alaska
2014 Alaska elections
Mark Begich